The National Maritime Intelligence-Integration Office (NMIO) is a United States Navy entity located in the National Maritime Intelligence Center (NMIC) Facility in Suitland, Maryland, southeast of Washington, D.C. In 1991, the NMIC was built on the location of 3 baseball fields used by the Census Bureau at the Suitland Federal Center.

The NMIO's mission is to:

The office was established due to guidance from the 9/11 Commission, the Intelligence Reform and Terror Prevention Act (IRTPA), Presidential directives, and maritime security plans. Its goal is to support national policymakers and decision-makers on naval issues and act as directed by ODNI Strategic Guidance to create unity of effort and position leaders for decision advantage decisively and efficiently. The office focuses on collaboration between federal, state, local, tribal, and territorial governments, acting in concert with the U.S. Government's international partners and representatives from the private sector and academia.

NMIO is co-located with the Office of Naval Intelligence (ONI), the Naval Information Warfare Activity (NIWA), and the Coast Guard Intelligence Coordination Center (ICC).

The Director of the NMIO is Rear Admiral Michael W. Studeman, USN; the Deputy Director is Captain Gene Anzano, USCG.

References

External links

United States Navy organization
United States intelligence agencies
Buildings and structures in Prince George's County, Maryland
Military installations in Maryland
Naval intelligence